The Rajpura–Bathinda line is a railway line connecting  and  in the Indian state of Punjab. The line is under the administrative jurisdiction of Northern Railway.

Main stations
    
    
   Nabha 
    
    
   Tapa
   Rampura phul
   Lehra mahabat
   Bhuchchu

History and key developments on the route 
The Maharaja of Patiala was built the railway station in the perpendicular orientation as he had hoped that one day the Ambala–Ludhiana would be diverted via Patiala, but that never happened. One reason was the trains would have to pay the taxes levied by the Pepsu state.

In February 2015, doubling of track between Rajpura–Patiala–Bathinda was sanctioned.

In 2016, electrification of the single broad-gauge railway line from Rajpura to Dhuri junction is under progress which is being executed by Rail Vikas Nigam Ltd.

Patiala railway station on the line is also one of the 400 stations to be redeveloped under the Government of India's AMRUT scheme. In 2016, the work for the platform-1 extension is in progress which shall be extended to another 200 meters to accommodate the longest possible train.

In March 2017, work for doubling of Rajpura–Patiala–Bathinda line was partly given to Northern railway construction but later all was allotted and interested in rail Vikas Nigam limited. As it is also a feeder route for Eastern Dedicated Freight Corridor. It has capacity utilization to the peak. The doubling is scheduled to start for December 2018.

Electrification
The rail link has been approved by the rail board for electrification to the Lehra Mahabat railway station and doubling to Bathinda junction. The electrification trail between Rajpura and Dhuri was completed on 10 September 2019. Commission of Railway Safety(CRS) has given clearance to electrification up to Dhuri Junction.

References

Rail transport in Punjab, India
Northern Railway zone
5 ft 6 in gauge railways in India
Transport in Bathinda